Mersal may refer to:

Arts 
Mersal (film), a 2017 Tamil language action thriller film.
Mersal (soundtrack), a soundtrack to the 2017 film
Mersal al-Gharam, a 2004 Syrian novel by Fawwaz Haddad, also known as The Love Messenger

People 
 Iman Mersal (born 1966), Egyptian poet
 Hatem Mersal (born 1975), Egyptian former long jumper
 Mahmoud Mersal (born 1940), Egyptian former Olympic boxer
 Ragab Mersal (born 1945), Egyptian former Olympic table tennis sport
 Nafi Mersal (born 1960), Egyptian sprinter

Other uses 
 Mersalyl, an organomercury compound used as drug